PRMC may refer to:

 Potential Royal Marine Course, British military training
 Parents Music Resource Center, an American committee 
 Presbyterian and Reformed Missions Council on Taiwan, part of Reformed Presbyterian Church in Taiwan